Jim David Garner (born June 14, 1963) is an American politician, who served from 2003 to 2011 as the Kansas Secretary of Labor. Garner was appointed to the post by former Governor Kathleen Sebelius.

Garner attended Coffeyville public schools, graduating from Field Kindley High School and Coffeyville Community College. He earned a B.A. in history from the University of Kansas and a J.D. from the University of Kansas School of Law.

Following law school, Garner served a two-year appointment as a research attorney for U.S. District Judge Dale E. Saffels of the U.S. District Court for the District of Kansas.

Garner served six terms in the Kansas House of Representatives, having been first elected to the 11th District in November 1990. He served as the ranking Democrat on the House Judiciary Committee, as Vice Chairman of the House Rules Committee and as a member of the House Taxation Committee, the House Insurance Committee, and the House Business, Commerce and Labor Committee.

In December 1998, Garner was unanimously elected to serve as the House Minority Leader of the Kansas House of Representatives and was re-elected to that position in 2000.

On January 7, 2003, Governor Kathleen Sebelius announced her selection of Garner to serve as Acting Secretary of the Kansas Department of Labor, and on March 28 the Governor selected him to serve as Secretary of Labor.

References

External links
Kansas Department of Labor
Jim Garner - Kansas State Library

Living people
1963 births
People from Coffeyville, Kansas
Democratic Party members of the Kansas House of Representatives
State cabinet secretaries of Kansas
University of Kansas alumni
University of Kansas School of Law alumni
Kansas lawyers
Coffeyville Community College alumni
20th-century American politicians
21st-century American politicians